Aruba competed at the 2017 World Championships in Athletics in London, United Kingdom, 4–13 August 2017.

Results

Men
Field events

Nations at the 2017 World Championships in Athletics
World Championships in Athletics
2017